Henry J. Overbeck (February 2, 1853 – March 3, 1921) was an insurance agent, telegraph operator, and politician.

Born in Tonawanda, New York, Overbeck moved with his parents to Lake Mills, Wisconsin in 1855. Overbeck was the manager of Western Union in Sturgeon Bay, Wisconsin and was a telegraph operator and insurance agent. Overbeck was involved with the Republican Party. From 1897 to 1903, Overbeck served in the Wisconsin State Assembly. Overbeck died in a hospital in Milwaukee, Wisconsin from pneumonia due to from surgery for a throat infection.

Notes

1853 births
1921 deaths
People from Tonawanda, New York
People from Sturgeon Bay, Wisconsin
Western Union people
Businesspeople from Wisconsin
People from Lake Mills, Wisconsin
Republican Party members of the Wisconsin State Assembly